Route nationale 13  (RN 13) is a primary highway in Madagascar of 493 km, running from Ihosy to Tolagnaro (Fort-Dauphin). It crosses the regions of Ihorombe, Androy and  Anosy.

It is completely unpaved between Ihosy and Ambovombe, paved but in bad shape between Ambovombe and Tolagnaro.

It was planned to pave the section between Ihosy and Ambovombe from 2009 on with funding by the European Union but this project was stopped due to the political take over of Andry Rajoelina and the 2009 Malagasy political crisis.

Selected locations on route
(north to south)
Ihosy - intersection with Route nationale 7
Betroka
(crossing Mangoky River)
Kalambatritra Reserve at 55 km east
Ianabinda
Beraketa
Antanimora Atsimo
Ambovombe - intersection with Route nationale 10
Amboasary Sud
 Mandrare River crossing
 Berenty Reserve
 Lake Anony
 Italy Bay
Ranopiso
Manambaro
Tolagnaro (Fort-Dauphin) -  continues North as Route nationale 12a

See also
List of roads in Madagascar
Transport in Madagascar

References

Roads in Anosy
Roads in Androy
Roads in Ihorombe
Roads in Madagascar